Shibasaki (written: 柴崎, 柴咲, etc.) is a Japanese surname. Notable people with the surname include:

, Japanese footballer
, Japanese footballer
, Japanese actress
, Japanese chemist
, Japanese footballer
, Japanese writer

Fictional characters
Shibasaki family, fictional family in the anime Rozen Maiden

See also
Shibasaki Station, a railway station in Chōfu, Tokyo, Japan

Japanese-language surnames